Lizzie Webb (née Beveridge; 12 August 1948), often known as "Mad Lizzie", is an English fitness expert, author and presenter. In the 1980s and 1990s she presented daily exercise routines on British morning television channel TV-am. She was introduced onto the channel's flagship show Good Morning Britain in response to the popularity of exercise teacher Diana Moran ("the Green Goddess") on the rival BBC One show Breakfast Time. She created many videos, such as Pop Dance with Lizzie, Shake-out with Lizzie and many more. She has produced 9 videos (8 exercise, 1 dance) and 8 books. Her first video was The Body Programme with Lizzie Webb and her last was Pop Dance with Lizzie!!!

However Webb's most successful venture is Joggy Bear, a children's TV character who now runs his own touring fitness club. Both Lizze and Joggy starred in their own television show from the late 1980s to early 1990s for Channel 4. The series at its peak reached number 2 in the video charts in 1992. Webb now tours with Joggy, running fitness classes and stage show across the UK.

Lizzie Webb's first fitness video released on VHS by MSD Video, topped the UK video charts in 1987. In 1988, after the Julio Iglesias and Stevie Wonder duet "My Love" was a UK Top 5 hit after being featured during Webb's workout segments on TV-am, she was invited to curate her own love songs compilation album, entitled "From Lizzie With Love", and released for the 1988 Christmas market.

Webb was married to maths teacher Andrew Webb with whom she had a son, but after a nine year marriage they divorced. In 2008 she married Douglas Cameron.

Webb has since appeared on ITV's That Antony Cotton Show, an episode of Pointless Celebrities and as a guest on Loose Women in 2018.

References

External links
 
TV-am's official website and agent for Lizzie Webb
Photograph of Lizzie Webb – National Osteoporosis Society

1948 births
People from Chipping Barnet
Living people
British exercise instructors
English television presenters